M. dianthi may refer to:

 Macrophoma dianthi, an anamorphic fungus
 Mycosphaerella dianthi, a plant pathogen